Greatest Hits is a compilation album by Terence Trent D'Arby, released in 2002.

It contains two CDs, with the second CD including covers, remixes, and live versions.

Track listing

CD 1
 "Wishing Well" (3:30)
 "If You Let Me Stay" (3:13)
 "Dance Little Sister" (3:54)
 "Sign Your Name" (4:36)
 "Elevators & Hearts" (4:03)
 "Heartbreak Hotel" (2:12)
 "The Birth of Maudie (The Incredible E.G. O'Reilly)" (2:59)
 "This Side of Love" (5:01)
 "To Know Someone Deeply Is to Know Someone Softly" (4:27)
 "Billy Don't Fall" (4:19)
 "It's Alright Ma (I'm Only Bleeding)" (3:42)
 "Do You Love Me Like You Say?" (3:59)
 "Delicate" (featuring Des'ree) (4:16)
 "She Kissed Me" (3:46)
 "Let Her Down Easy" (Single Version) (4:09)
 "Right Thing, Wrong Way" (5:13)
 "Holding On to You" (5:03)
 "Vibrator" (4:27)
 "A Change Is Gonna Come" (Terence Trent D'Arby and Booker T and The MG's (4:49)

CD 2
 "Wonderful World" (3:57)
 "Under My Thumb" (Live) (4:50)
 "Jumping Jack Flash" (Live) (4:17)
 "Greasy Chicken" (Live) (4:41)
 "Rain" (Live) (3:18)
 "Wishing Well" (Three Coins In A Fountain Mix) -- Mixed by Martyn Ware (6:13)
 "Dance Little Sister (Part One & Two)" (8:40)
 "Sign Your Name" (Lee 'Scratch' Perry Remix) (5:18)
 "To Know Someone Deeply Is to Know Someone Softly" (Samba Mix) (5:15)
 "Do You Love Me Like You Say?" (Masters at Work Mix) (7:47)
 "Perfumed Pavillion" (4:21)
 "Survivor" (3:19)

References

2002 compilation albums
Terence Trent D'Arby albums
Columbia Records compilation albums